Ramoth-Gilead (meaning "Heights of Gilead"), was a Levitical city and city of refuge east of the Jordan River in the Hebrew Bible, also called "Ramoth in Gilead" or "Ramoth Galaad" in the Douay–Rheims Bible. It was located in the tribal territorial allotment of the tribe of Gad.

Biblical events

He was responsible for ("to him belonged") the towns of Jair the son of Manasseh, in Gilead and the region of Argob in Bashan: sixty large cities with walls and bronze gate-bars.

It appears to have been lost to Syria (Aram-Damascus) during the battles between the northern kingdom of Israel and Syria, as Ahab, King of Israel, proposed to go to battle to win it back. After consulting prophets about the prospects of success, Ahab went to fight for Ramoth in Gilead, aided by Jehoshaphat, King of Judah. During the battle, Ahab was wounded by an arrow. He was propped up in his chariot facing the enemy, but by evening Ahab had bled to death and the Syrians won the battle.

Later, an incident occurred when Ahaziah and Joram fought against Hazael, king of Aram-Damascus, and Joram was wounded (2 Kings 8:28).

Also in this city, Elisha, the prophet of God told one of the sons of the prophets to anoint Jehu, Joram's commander, king over Israel.

Location
It has been tentatively identified with Reimun, on the northern slope of the Jabbok, about 5 miles west of Jerash or Gerasa, one of the cities of Decapolis.

Other possible locations include:
Tell er-Rumeith, about 3 miles south of Ar-Ramtha, Jordan 
Al-Salt.

References

External links
 Photos of Rumeith at the American Center of Research

Torah cities
Hebrew Bible cities
Levitical cities